Clunie is a surname. Notable people with the surname include:

 David Clunie (born 1948), Scottish footballer
 James Clunie (1889–1974), British politician
 Jim Clunie (1933–2003), Scottish footballer
 Michelle Clunie (born 1969), American actress
 Robert Clunie (1895–1984), Scottish–American artist
 Thomas J. Clunie (1852–1903), American politician